Mekinje nad Stično (in older sources also Mekine) is a settlement just north of Stična in the Municipality of Ivančna Gorica in central Slovenia. The area is part of the historical region of Lower Carniola. The municipality is now included in the Central Slovenia Statistical Region.

Name
The name of the settlement was changed from Mekinje to Mekinje nad Stično in 1953.

References

External links

Mekinje nad Stično on Geopedia

Populated places in the Municipality of Ivančna Gorica